Bakar-e Sofla (also Romanized as Bakar-e Soflá; also known as Bakar-e Dūmen and Bakar-e Pā’īn) is a village in Poshtkuh-e Rostam Rural District, Sorna District, Rostam County, Fars Province, Iran. At the 2006 census, its population was 139, in 32 families.

References 

Populated places in Rostam County